Kabilasi  is a Village Development Committee in Sarlahi District in the Janakpur Zone of south-eastern Nepal. At the time of the 1991 Nepal census it had a population of 7,050 people residing in 1,362 individual households.

References

External links
UN map of the municipalities of Sarlahi  District

Populated places in Sarlahi District
Nepal municipalities established in 2017
Municipalities in Madhesh Province